Beitang (meaning "North Pond"), alternately known as Pei-t'ang and Pehtang (amongst other variants), is a subdistrict of the Binhai New Area, Tianjin, People's Republic of China, near the mouth of the Hai River. , it administered 2 residential communities and 4 villages.

History

1900
 September 20 - The Battle of Beitang was fought here between the Eight Nation Alliance and the Great Qing army.

See also
List of township-level divisions of Tianjin

References

Township-level divisions of Tianjin